Raga Rockers is a Norwegian rock band from Oslo with Michael Krohn on vocals. The band was formed in 1982 by front man Michael Krohn. The other original members were Livio Aiello on bass, Bruno Hovden on guitar, Jan Arne Kristiansen on drums, Hugo Alvarstein on keyboards. They recorded their first album in 1983, called The Return of the Raga Rockers. One year later they recorded their second album, Maskiner i Nirvana. Tore Berg on guitar in 1984 and Nils Aune on guitar and keyboards in 1988. The band has made various changes in its line-up with more recent joiners including Hugo Alvarstein, Eivind Staxrud and Hågen Rørmark.

After a long hiatus from 2000 onwards, the band had a big comeback in 2007 with their album Übermensch that topped the VG-lista, a Norwegian albums chart and the single "Aldri mer" taken from the album making it to number five in the Norwegian singles chart. The follow-up album Shit Happens also made it to number on the VG-lista chart.

Members
Original line-up
Michael Krohn - vocals (1982–present)
Livio Aiello - bass (1982–present)
Jan Arne Kristiansen - drums and percussion (1982–present)
Arne Sæther - keyboards (1982–present)
Bruno Hovden – guitar (1982–1985)

Changes
Tore Berg, a guitarist and keyboards player joined in 1984, just two years after the formation of the band and stayed until 2000.

Bruno Hovden played on the debut album The Return of the Raga Rockers and the follow-up Maskiner i Nirvana. He died shortly after being critically injured in a car accident in January 1985.

Guitarist Nils Aune joined in 1988–1989 credited on the albums Forbudte følelser (1988) and Blaff (1989) before leaving for a full decade and returning in 1998 to stay until 2009.
 
Relatively newer members who are presently members still members include Hugo Alvarstein on guitar, keyboards who joined in 1995, guitarist Eivind Staxsrud who joined in 2009 and guitarist Hågen Rørmark who joined in 2010.

Covers
Norwegian black metal group Vreid recorded a Raga Rockers cover ("Noen Å Hate"), and in January 2010 released it as part of a three song digital single.

Discography

Albums
Studio albums

Live albums

Compilations

Singles

References

Norwegian rock music groups
Musical groups established in 1982
1982 establishments in Norway
Musical groups from Oslo